Leporinus gomesi is a species of Leporinus widely found in the Aripuanã River basin in Brazil in South America. This species can reach a length of  SL.

Etymology
It is named in honor of João Gomes da Silva, of the Universidade Federal de São Carlos, who collected the type specimen.

References

Garavello, J.C. and H.A. Britski, 2003. Anostomidae (Headstanders). p. 71-84. In R.E. Reis, S.O. Kullander and C.J. Ferraris, Jr. (eds.) Checklist of the Freshwater Fishes of South and Central America. Porto Alegre: EDIPUCRS, Brasil.

Taxa named by Júlio César Garavello
Taxa named by Geraldo Mendes dos Santos
Taxa described in 1981
Fish described in 1981
Anostomidae